Daniel Christopher Hulme (born 7 October 1979, Melbourne) is a former member of the Tasmanian House of Assembly in the electorate of Franklin representing the Labor Party. He entered parliament on a recount in February 2009 after Paula Wriedt resigned due to ill health. He received 620 primary votes at the 2006 State Election, finishing 11th in a field of 18., but received 8,097 out of 10,660 or 78.0% of votes in the recount. He was defeated in 2010.

Prior to entering Parliament, Hulme worked as an electorate officer for Premier Paul Lennon, then for Labor Senator Catryna Bilyk. He has also worked for the Australian Taxation Office and the Australian Computer Society.

Hulme graduated from the University of Tasmania with a Bachelor of Computing in 2000, a Bachelor of Computing with Honours in 2001 and a Master of Business Administration in 2008.

He was president of the University of Tasmania Student Association (Launceston campus) in 2002 and 2003.

Hulme spoke strongly in support of the Tasmanian forest industry and the Regional Forest Agreement at the Timber Communities Australia (TCA) state conference, 4 July 2009. In his speech, he strongly criticised Bob Brown, The Wilderness Society and the Greens. He said he recently became a TCA member.

References

External links
 Daniel Hulme's maiden speech to parliament
 ALP profile page

1979 births
Living people
Members of the Tasmanian House of Assembly
Australian Labor Party members of the Parliament of Tasmania
21st-century Australian politicians